John W. Hines, Sr. (born April 6, 1966) is an American politician serving as a member of the Mississippi House of Representatives from the 50th District. A member of the Democratic party, he is also a member of the Mississippi Democratic Party's executive committee.

References

1966 births
Living people
Democratic Party members of the Mississippi House of Representatives
African-American state legislators in Mississippi
21st-century American politicians
21st-century African-American politicians
20th-century African-American people